Callimont is a borough in Somerset County, Pennsylvania, United States. The population was 53 at the 2020 census. It is part of the Johnstown, Pennsylvania, Metropolitan Statistical Area.

Geography

Demographics

As of the census of 2000, there were 51 people, 19 households, and 14 families living in the borough. The population density was 11.4 people per square mile (4.4/km2). There were 24 housing units at an average density of 5.4 per square mile (2.1/km2). The racial makeup of the borough was 100.00% White.

There were 19 households, out of which 26.3% had children under the age of 18 living with them, 57.9% were married couples living together, 21.1% had a female householder with no husband present, and 21.1% were non-families. 21.1% of all households were made up of individuals, and 5.3% had someone living alone who was 65 years of age or older. The average household size was 2.68 and the average family size was 2.87.

In the borough the population was spread out, with 21.6% under the age of 18, 13.7% from 18 to 24, 27.5% from 25 to 44, 29.4% from 45 to 64, and 7.8% who were 65 years of age or older. The median age was 35 years. For every 100 females there were 96.2 males. For every 100 females age 18 and over, there were 110.5 males.

The median income for a household in the borough was $49,750, and the median income for a family was $49,250. Males had a median income of $38,750 versus $30,000 for females. The per capita income for the borough was $19,813. There were no families and 3.8% of the population living below the poverty line, including no under eighteen and none of those over 64.

References

Boroughs in Somerset County, Pennsylvania